Grettstadt is a municipality in the district of Schweinfurt in Bavaria, Germany. It consists of the following villages: Dürrfeld, Grettstadt, Obereuerheim, Untereuerheim.

References

Schweinfurt (district)